The following lists events that happened during 1984 in South Africa.

Incumbents
 State President:
 Marais Viljoen (until 3 September).
 P.W. Botha (from 14 September).
 Prime Minister: P.W. Botha (until 14 September).
 Chief Justice: Pieter Jacobus Rabie.

Events

January
 8 – The South African Defence Force begins withdrawal from southern Angola.
 16 – The South African Railways inaugurates the MetroBlitz interurban high speed train service between Pretoria and Johannesburg.
 30 – Patrick McCall of the Stander gang is killed by police in a raid on the gang's hide-out in Houghton, Johannesburg.

February
 3 – A bomb destroys the offices of the Ciskei consulate in Durban.
 23 – An Escom installation in Georgetown is slightly damaged by an explosion.
 29 – Two bombs explode at Mandini, one at a sub-station and the other at the police station.

March
 11 – The Mobil fuel depot in Ermelo is rocked by four explosions and five storage tanks are destroyed.
 12 – During a skirmish with insurgents, two policemen are seriously injured.
 16 – South Africa and Mozambique sign the Nkomati Accord, a non-aggression treaty, at Komatipoort.
 23 – Dorothy Nyembe is released from Kroonstad Prison after serving 15 years.

April
 3 – The African National Congress denies responsibility after a car bomb explodes on the Victoria Embankment, Durban, killing three and injuring twenty. 
 5 – The Transkei consulate in Botshabelo is destroyed by a bomb.
 An insurgent is killed at De Deur.

May
 2 – South Africa, Mozambique and Portugal sign an agreement on electricity supply from the Cahora Bassa dam.
 5 – Over 7,000 people attend an Afrikaner Volkswag rally in Pretoria.
 12 – A bomb explodes at the Trust Bank in Durban.
 13 – The Mobil Oil Refinery in Durban comes under RPG-7 attack by Umkhonto we Sizwe insurgents who are all killed afterwards in a running battle with police.
 16 – Outside the Jabulani Police station in Soweto an explosion destroys two private vehicles belonging to policemen.
 18 – The railway line near Lenasia is damaged by an explosion.
 29 – Prime Minister P.W. Botha and minister of foreign affairs Pik Botha visit Austria, Belgium, France, Great Britain, Italy, Portugal, Switzerland and West Germany.
 Mutineers systematically kill most camp administration members at Umkhonto we Sizwe's Pango training camp in Angola.

June
 21 – An explosion damages a sub-station in Berea, Durban and disrupts electricity supply.
 28 – Jeannette Schoon and her six-year-old daughter Katryn are killed by a letter bomb at Lubango, Angola.

July
 9 – South Africa signs the amendment of the International Convention for the Conservation of Atlantic Tunas.
 12 – One policeman is killed and one is injured when their vehicle is attacked in Jabulani.
 28 – The South African Railways Police charge office in KwaMashu, Durban is attacked with hand grenades.

August
 3 – A guerrilla is killed in the Ellisras area.
 7 – Tshabalala Dry Cleaners in Soweto is extensively damaged by Umkhonto we Sizwe.
 7 – An Escom sub-station is destroyed in Glenmore, Durban.
 12 – The Department of Internal Affairs of Johannesburg is hit by an explosion that causes minor damage.
 16 – Two Limpet mines destroy two floors of the South African Police HQ, Soweto East in Roodepoort, injuring the District Commander, four policemen and two civilians.
 17 – A guerrilla is killed while resisting arrest in Mapetla.
 23 – Explosions destroy 4th floor offices of the government in a building in Booysens, Johannesburg.
 24 – A bomb explodes in Anchor Life Building in Johannesburg, destroying the South African Railways Police regional offices and the Department of Internal Affairs offices.

September
 3 – A limpet mine placed by Mo Shaik explodes at the Department of Internal Affairs in Johannesburg.
 3 – During riots in the Vaal Triangle instigated by the Vaal Civic Association (VCA) supported by the UDF and COSAS, councillors Caesar Motjeane and Kuzwayo Dlamini are doused with petrol and burned alive and the police resort to sharp ammunition to restore order.
 5 – An explosion destroys an Escom sub-station at Rustenburg and disrupts power to Rustenburg and a large area of Bophutatswana.
 7 – VCA vice-chairman Esau Raditsela admits to VCA chairman Lord McCamel and UDF leader Frank Chikane that he had started the riots four days before, but the UDF continues to blame the government and police.
 13 – A Limpet mine causes damage to a Durban sub-station.
 14 – The position of Prime Minister is abolished.
 14 – P.W. Botha is inaugurated as the first executive State President of South Africa.
 14 – A bomb explodes at the Department of Community Development in Krugersdorp.

October
 8 – South Africa, Mozambique and Renamo hold talks in Pretoria to end the civil war in Mozambique.
 16 – Anglican Archbishop Desmond Tutu is awarded the Nobel Peace Prize.

December
 11 – A section of railway line near Durban and a goods train are damaged by an explosion.
 14 – A guerrilla is killed and a policeman is injured in a skirmish in Ingwavuma.
 18 – Foreign minister Pik Botha and President of Somalia Siad Barre hold talks in Mogadishu.
 25 – Another guerrilla is killed in Ingwavuma.

Unknown Date
 The government imposes a state of emergency that would stay in place for six years.

Births
 21 January – Aaron Phangiso, cricketer
 24 January – Senzo Meyiwa, South Africa national football team captain (d. 2014)
 29 January – Natalie du Toit, amputee swimmer
 2 February – Thembinkosi Fanteni, football player
 17 February – AB de Villiers, cricketer
 20 February – Trevor Noah, comedian, actor and television personality
 26 February – Minki van der Westhuizen, model and television presenter
 4 March – Jeremy Loops, singer
 5 March – Lindani Nkosi, actor
 7 March – Lonwabo Tsotsobe, cricketer
 10 March – Ruan Pienaar, rugby player
 6 April – Siboniso Gaxa, football player
 14 April – JP Duminy, cricketer
 11 May – Willem Alberts, rugby player
 20 May – Duduzane Zuma, businessman, son of the former President of South Africa, Jacob Zuma
 22 May – Bismarck du Plessis, rugby player
 6 June – Atandwa Kani, actor, son of actor John Kani
 16 June – Zane Kirchner, rugby player
 11 July – Morné Steyn, rugby player
 13 July – Faf du Plessis, South Africa national cricket team captain
 15 August – Peter Grant (rugby union), rugby player
 28 August – Darian Townsend, swimmer, Olympic gold medalist
 31 August – Charl Schwartzel, golfer
 7 September – Letoya Makhene, singer & actress
 25 September – Siphiwe Tshabalala, football player
 1 October – Abigail Pietersen, figure skater
 3 October – Thabo Nthethe, football player
 6 October – Morné Morkel, cricketer
 8 October – Tansey Coetzee, Miss South Africa 2007
 14 October – Amalia Uys, actress
 19 October – Presley Chweneyagae, actor, lead actor in the film Tsotsi, which won the Academy Award for Foreign Language Film at the 78th Academy Awards.
 11 November – Kelly Khumalo, singer, actress and dancer
 24 November – Kagisho Dikgacoi, football player
 29 November – Katlego Mphela, football player
 1 December – Yolandi Visser, rapper, female vocalist in the rap-rave group Die Antwoord
 2 December – Sjava, singer, rapper, actor
 27 December – Gail Mabalane, actress

Deaths
 March – John Fairbairn, naval officer, (b. 1912)

Railways

Locomotives
Two new Cape gauge locomotive types enter service on the South African Railways:
 The first of forty-five Class 6E1,  electric locomotives. These are the last of altogether 960 Class 6E1 locomotives to be built.
 The first of twenty-five 25 kV AC Class 7E3, Series 2 electric locomotives.

Sports

Athletics
 31 March – Ernest Seleke wins his first national title in the men's marathon, clocking 2:09:41 in Port Elizabeth.
 11 August – Barefoot runner Zola Budd and Mary Decker of the United States collide in the Olympic 3,000 meters final and neither finish as medallist.

Motorsport
 7 April – The South African Grand Prix takes place at Kyalami.

References

South Africa
Years in South Africa
History of South Africa